Rua 24 Horas is a shopping mall in Curitiba, Brazil.

History
The Rua 24 Horas was opened by Jaime Lerner, the mayor of Curitiba, in 1991. It initially opened 24 hours a day. The mall closed in 2007, reopening in 2011 after a redevelopment. On reopening, the hours were limited to 9:00 AM to 10:00 PM.

References

Tourist attractions in Curitiba
1991 establishments in Brazil
Shopping centers in Brazil